Steamboat River may refer to:

 Steamboat River (Cass County, Minnesota), a stream
 Steamboat River Township, Hubbard County, Minnesota, a civil township